Lophoptera is a genus of moths of the family Noctuidae.

Species
 Lophoptera abbreviata Walker, 1865
 Lophoptera africana 	(Berio, 1974)
 Lophoptera arabica Hacker & Fibiger, 2006
 Lophoptera bismigera Holloway,
 Lophoptera buruana  (Holland, 1900)
 Lophoptera conspicua 	Berio, 1957
 Lophoptera hemithyris Hampson, 1905
 Lophoptera illucida (Walker, 1865)
 Lophoptera lineigera Holloway,
 Lophoptera litigiosa 	(Boisduval, 1833)
 Lophoptera longipennis (Moore, 1882)
 Lophoptera melanesigera Holloway, 1985
 Lophoptera methyalea 	(Hampson, 1902)
 Lophoptera nama Swinhoe, 1900
 Lophoptera paranthyala  (Holland, 1900)
 Lophoptera pustulifera  (Walker, 1864)
 Lophoptera semirufa 	Druce, 1911
 Lophoptera squammigera Guenee, 1852
 Lophoptera vittigera Walker, 1865
 Lophoptera togata 	Prout A. E., 1927
 Lophoptera triangulata Berio, 1973

References

 Moths of Borneo
 afromoths
 Hacker, H. & Fibiger, M. (2006). "Updated list of Micronoctuidae, Noctuidae (s.l.), and Hyblaeidae species of Yemen, collected during three expeditions in 1996, 1998 and 2000, with comments and descriptions of species." Esperiana Buchreihe zur Entomologie 12: 75-166. 
 Lophoptera at funet.fi

Stictopterinae